Now That's What I Call Country Volume 5 is an album from the Now! series released in the United States on June 12, 2012.

Critical reception

Steve Leggett of Allmusic says the fifth installment in the Now That's What I Call Country series "provides a pretty accurate template of contemporary country music on the airwaves a decade and some change into the 21st century."

Track listing

Charts

Weekly charts

Year-end charts

References

Country 05
Country music compilation albums
2012 compilation albums